Alejandro Martín González (born August 11, 1973) is a Mexican former professional boxer who held the WBC featherweight and IBA lightweight titles. He was the father of Alejandro González Jr.

Professional career
González made his professional debut on April 28, 1988 at the age of 14. In May 1992, he won the WBC International Featherweight Championship by Knocking out Paquito Openo. In his fourth defense of that regional title, he stopped future champion Luisito Espinosa. Four wins later, he defeated another future champion, Cesar Soto, in a WBC title eliminator bout, improving his record to 33-2-0.

WBC Featherweight Championship
On January 7, 1995, he won the WBC Featherweight Championship by upsetting an undefeated Kevin Kelley. In the tenth round Kelley's corner threw in the towel, after Alejandro had landed many heavy shots. He defended it for the first time against former champion Louie Espinoza by unanimous decision. Two months later he would have his second title defense against American Tony Green in Mashantucket, Connecticut. Alejandro won by ninth round T.K.O. He lost the title in his next fight to Manuel Medina by split decision in a closely contested bout. He attempted to recover the title against Luisito Espinosa, whom he had previously defeated, but was stopped in the fourth round.

IBA Lightweight Championship
On March 11, 2000 González would upset another undefeated American, Steve Forbes to win the IBA Lightweight Championship. Several wins later, he defeated future champion Orlando Salido by majority decision. He next lost to former champion Stevie Johnston by another majority decision. In his final career fight, he defeated John Brown, once again, by majority decision.

Professional boxing record

See also
List of Mexican boxing world champions
Notable boxing families
List of WBC world champions
List of featherweight boxing champions

References

External links

Boxers from Jalisco
Sportspeople from Guadalajara, Jalisco
World boxing champions
World Boxing Council champions
World featherweight boxing champions
Lightweight boxers
Featherweight boxers
1973 births
Living people
Mexican male boxers